NGC 78 is a pair of galaxies in the constellation Pisces. NGC 78A, which is the more southern galaxy, is a barred spiral galaxy. NGC 78B, which is the more northern galaxy, is an elliptical galaxy. Although the designations NGC 78A and 78B are used today, the designation NGC 78 was formerly used mainly for the northern galaxy.

NGC 78 was discovered no later than 1876 by Carl Frederick Pechüle. It was described as "very faint, small, round" by John Louis Emil Dreyer, the compiler of the New General Catalogue. Because the two galaxies have different recessional velocities, the two galaxies are most likely not interacting.

References

Notes

External links
 

0078
001306
00193
Pisces (constellation)
Barred spiral galaxies
Elliptical galaxies
?